The Shire of Hepburn is a local government area in Victoria, Australia, located in the central part of the state.

It includes the towns of Clunes, Creswick, Daylesford, Hepburn Springs and Trentham and the villages of Glenlyon, Allendale, Kingston, Leonard's Hill, Lyonville, Newlyn, Denver and Smeaton.

It was formed in 1995 from the amalgamation of the Shire of Creswick, Shire of Daylesford and Glenlyon and parts of the Shire of Kyneton and Shire of Talbot and Clunes.

The Shire is governed and administered by the Hepburn Shire Council; its seat of local government and administrative centre is located at the council headquarters in Daylesford, it also has a service centre located in Creswick. The Shire is named after an early squatter named John Hepburn, who established the Smeaton Hill pastoral run, which was located a few kilometres north of present-day Creswick.

Council

Current composition
The council is composed of five wards and seven councillors, with two councillors per ward elected to represent each of the Creswick and Birch wards, and one councillor per remaining ward elected to represent each of the other wards. As of 2020, the current councillors are:

Administration and governance
The council meets in the council chambers at the council headquarters in the Daylesford Municipal Offices, which is also the location of the council's administrative activities. It also provides customer services at both its administrative centre in Daylesford, and its service centre in Creswick.

Townships and localities
The 2021 census, the shire had a population of 16,604 up from 15,330 in the 2016 census

^ - Territory divided with another LGA
* - Not noted in 2016 Census
# - Not noted in 2021 Census

Traditional owners 
The traditional owners of the Shire of Hepburn are the Dja Dja Wurrung.

References

External links
Hepburn Shire Council official website
PTV local public transport map

Local government areas of Victoria (Australia)
Grampians (region)